Cuono "Nello" Di Costanzo (born 26 July 1961) is an Italian football manager and former player, who played as a forward, last in charge of Taranto.

Career

Playing
A striker, he played in the youth ranks of AC Milan and Napoli, winning also a Campionato Nazionale Primavera title; however, despite this, he spent his whole career in the Italian lower leagues.

Coaching
In 1995, he started his coaching career with Prima Categoria team Viribus Unitis, which he led to three promotions in four years, leading them to Serie D. He then coached Palmese in 1999–2000 before to return at Viribus Unitis the following season, barely missing the Serie D league title. He was then called in 2001 to coach Gladiator, leading the Santa Maria Capua Vetere-based team to win their Serie D round, thus ensuring them promotion to Serie C2. In 2002, he accepted an offer from then-Serie C1 team Benevento, obtaining an eighth place in his first season but being ultimately sacked in the 2003–2004 mid-season due to poor results. He then led Juve Stabia to a second place in the 2004–2005 Serie C2 before accepting an offer from Venezia. During his two-year spell with the arancioneroverdi, Di Costanzo immediately won the Serie C2 title and narrowly missed a second consecutive promotion the following season, after losing to Pisa in the promotion playoffs.

In 2007–08, he served as head coach of Messina, guiding the giallorossi to a mid-table finish in the season. He will coach Ascoli in the upcoming 2008–09 season. He was sacked on 21 October 2008 following a string of poor results.

On 9 February 2010, he was announced as new head coach of Serie B relegation-battling side Padova. His time at Padua lasted only a few weeks, as he failed to change the club's fortunes in the games he was in charge and was ultimately sacked on 10 April.

Since 7 February 2012 until the end of the season he was the new coach of Barletta in place of the sacked Marco Carri.

On 2 October 2012, he was named new coach of Carrarese in place of the resigned Carlo Sabatini.

In March 2018, he was hired by Pomigliano.

On 8 July 2019 he joined Serie D club Nocerina. He was dismissed by Nocerina on 21 October 2019.

He successively coached Serie D relegation-battling club Afragolese from March to June 2021. In October 2021, Di Costanzo signed for Brindisi, another Serie D club.

On 6 June 2022, Di Costanzo was announced as the new head coach of Serie C club Taranto on a one-year deal, thus marking his return into professional football after six years. He was dismissed on 12 September 2022, after the second matchday of the season, together with club's sporting director Nicola Dionisio.

References

External links
 Coaching career profile (as of 2008) 

1961 births
Living people
Footballers from Rome
Association football forwards
S.S. Turris Calcio players
Italian footballers
Italian football managers
Venezia F.C. managers
A.C.R. Messina managers
Benevento Calcio managers
Ascoli Calcio 1898 F.C. managers
Calcio Padova managers
S.S. Juve Stabia managers
Serie B managers
Serie C managers